Kustas Tonkmann (1 July 1882 Vaikna Parish (now Lääne-Nigula Parish), Wiek County – 13 August 1942 Sverdlovsk Oblast, Russian SFSR) was an Estonian politician. He was a member of the II, III, IV and V Riigikogu.

References

1882 births
1942 deaths
People from Lääne-Nigula Parish
People from Kreis Wiek
Farmers' Assemblies politicians
Members of the Riigikogu, 1923–1926
Members of the Riigikogu, 1926–1929
Members of the Riigikogu, 1929–1932
Members of the Riigikogu, 1932–1934
Estonian people executed by the Soviet Union
People who died in the Gulag